Evren Eren Elmalı (born 7 July 2000) is a Turkish professional footballer who plays as a leftback for Süper Lig club Trabzonspor.

Professional career
Elmalı is a youth product of Kartalspor and Kasımpaşa, signing his first professional contract with the latter in 2019. He began his senior career on loan with Silivrispor in the TFF First League for the 2019-20 season. He returned to Kasımpaşa for the 2020-21 season. He made his professional debut with Kasımpaşa in a 2-1 Süper Lig win over Alanyaspor on 11 January 2021. On 17 July 2022, Elmalı transferred to Trabzonspor on a 3-year contract.

International career
Elmalı was called up to the senior Turkey national team for UEFA Nations League matches in June 2022.

Honours
Turkish Super Cup: 2022

References

External links
 
 

2000 births
Living people
People from Kartal
Footballers from Istanbul
Turkish footballers
Turkey international footballers
Süper Lig players
TFF Third League players
Kasımpaşa S.K. footballers
Trabzonspor footballers
Association football fullbacks